Häusermann is a surname. Notable people with the surname include:

Jürg Häusermann (born 1951), Swiss-German media scholar
 (born 1948), Swiss composer and director
 (born 1977), Swiss political scientist